Frassinere is a frazione of Condove, in Piedmont, northern Italy.

It is a mountain borough located several km north-west from the centre of Condove, at the end of the provincial road nr. 200 starting from Condove and passing through to Mocchie.

Since July the 8th 1936 Mocchie was a separate comune (municipality), which also encompassed several small villages as Alotti, Sinati, Molette, Reno, Mogliassi, Bar and Maffiotto.

References

Frazioni of the Province of Turin
Former municipalities of the Province of Turin
Condove